Christiana is a borough in Lancaster County, Pennsylvania, United States. The population was 1,100 at the time of the 2020 census.

In 1851, it was the site of the Battle of Christiana, also called the Christiana riot.

History
 Present-day Christiana was once known as Nobleville. The present name is after Christiana Noble, the wife of a first settler.

On September 11, 1851, Christiana was the site of the Battle of Christiana (also called the Christiana Riot), in which the local residents defended with firearms a fugitive slave, killing the slaveowner. Southerners demanded the hanging of those responsible, who were accused of treason and making war on the United States, but after the first defendant was acquitted, the government dropped the case. The trial was the first nationally covered challenge to the Fugitive Slave Act of 1850.

Geography
Christiana is located in eastern Lancaster County at  (39.955262, -75.996208). 

It is bordered to the north, west, and south by Sadsbury Township and to the east by West Sadsbury Township in Chester County.

Pennsylvania Route 372 passes through the center of the borough, leading east  to Parkesburg and west  to Quarryville.

The borough is in the valley of Pine Creek, which forms the Lancaster County/Chester County line, and which flows south to form Octoraro Creek, a south-flowing tributary of the Susquehanna River.

Demographics

Christiana is the least populous borough in Lancaster County.

As of the 2000 census,  there were 1,124 people, 383 households, and 284 families residing in the borough.

The population density was 2,121.6 people per square mile (818.8/km2). There were 391 housing units at an average density of 738.0 per square mile (284.8/km2).

The racial makeup of the borough was 96.09% White, 1.87% Black or African American, 0.18% Native American, 0.27% from other races, and 1.60% from two or more races.  4.00% of the population were Hispanic or Latino of any race.

There were 383 households, out of which 33.2% had children under the age of eighteen living with them; 58.7% were married couples living together, 11.5% had a female householder with no husband present, and 25.6% were non-families. 22.2% of all households were made up of individuals, and 9.1% had someone living alone who was sixty-five years of age or older. 

The average household size was 2.55 and the average family size was 3.00.

In the borough, the population was spread out, with 22.8% under the age of eighteen, 7.3% from eighteen to twenty-four, 26.8% from twenty-five to forty-four, 20.3% from forty-five to sixty-four, and 22.9% who were sixty-five years of age or older. The median age was forty years.

For every one hundred females, there were 85.2 males. For every one hundred females who were aged eighteen or older, there were 78.2 males.

The median income for a household in the borough was $48,333, and the median income for a family was $50,583. Males had a median income of $35,125 compared with that of $25,000 for females.

The per capita income for the borough was $18,764.

Roughly 3.8% of families and 6.3% of the population were living below the poverty line, including 13.5% of those who were under the age of eighteen and 1.6% of those who were aged sixty-five or older.

Education
The borough is served by the Octorara Area School District.

Notable people
David Hayes Agnew, surgeon and medical professor
William Walton Griest, former U.S. Congressman

References

External links

 

1833 establishments in Pennsylvania
Boroughs in Lancaster County, Pennsylvania
Populated places established in 1833
Underground Railroad locations